Pandemis rectipenita is a species of moth of the family Tortricidae. It is found in China (Xizang).

References

	

Moths described in 1982
Pandemis